The men's 100 kg judo competition at the 2008 Summer Paralympics was held on 9 September at the Beijing Workers' Gymnasium.

This event was the second-heaviest of the men's judo weight classes, limiting competitors to a maximum of 100 kilograms of body mass. Like all other judo events, bouts lasted five minutes. If the bout was still tied at the end, it was extended for another five-minute, sudden-death period; if neither judoka scored during that period, the match is decided by the judges. The tournament bracket consisted of a single-elimination contest culminating in a gold medal match. There was also a repechage to determine the winners of the two bronze medals. Each judoka who had lost to a semifinalist competed in the repechage. The two judokas who lost in the semifinals faced the winner of the opposite half of the bracket's repechage in bronze medal bouts.

A total of eleven judokas competed in the event. A twelfth competitor, Ahmed Kebaili of Algeria, was disqualified for failing a pre-match medical exam. He was to have had a bye in the first round followed by a bout against the winner of the Bill Morgan-Mykola Lyivytskyi match. Because of Kebaili's disqualification, the winner of the Morgan-Lyivytskyi match instead received a bye into the third round.

Final ranking

Tournament results

Repechage

References

External links
 

M100
Judo at the Summer Paralympics Men's Half Heavyweight